Lukoyanov is a town and the administrative center of Lukoyanovsky District in Nizhny Novgorod Oblast, Russia, located on the Tyosha River,  south of Nizhny Novgorod, the administrative center of the oblast. Population:

History
It was established in the 16th century and was granted town status in 1779.

Administrative and municipal status
Within the framework of administrative divisions, Lukoyanov serves as the administrative center of Lukoyanovsky District. As an administrative division, it is, together with the selo of Ulyanovo, incorporated within Lukoyanovsky District as the town of district significance of Lukoyanov. As a municipal division, the town of district significance of Lukoyanov is incorporated within Lukoyanovsky Municipal District as Lukoyanov Urban Settlement.

Climate

Notable people
Nikolay Urvantsev, geologist and explorer
Valery Taliev, botanist and evolutionary biologist

References

Notes

Sources

Cities and towns in Nizhny Novgorod Oblast
Lukoyanovsky District
Lukoyanovsky Uyezd